The 1996 Japan Cup was the 5th edition of the Japan Cup single-day cycling race. It was held on 27 October 1996, over a distance of 179.5 km, starting and finishing in Utsunomiya. It race was the final event of the 1996 UCI Road World Cup.

Results

References

Japan Cup
Japan Cup
Japan Cup